A Jubilee Clip is a genericised brand name for a worm drive hose clamp, a type of band clamp, consisting of a circular metal band or strip combined with a worm gear fixed to one end.  It is designed to hold a soft, pliable hose onto a rigid circular pipe, or sometimes a solid spigot, of smaller diameter.

Other names for the worm gear hose clamp include worm drive, worm gear clips, clamps, or just hose clips.  In the United Kingdom, Ireland and some of the former British colonies, the Jubilee Clip dominated the market to the extent that Jubilee Clips tend to be known almost exclusively by their brand name.

History
The Jubilee brand clamp brand was started by Commander Lumley Robinson of the British Royal Navy, who was granted the first patent for his device by the London Patent Office in 1921 while operating as a sole trader.  It is now subject to a registered trademark in many countries around the world. The design has been copied with many variations, and there are many other hose clips of a similar design.

Jubilee brand creator
Lumley Robinson was born in Leeds, Yorkshire, in 1877 to a family of strict Methodists.  His first job was working for John Fowler's, a highly respected engineering firm in Leeds before later joining the Royal Navy. He married Emily Boyd Sykes at the Mint Chapel, Holbeck, Leeds, on 23 October 1906 and they moved to Gillingham in Kent when Lumley was based at nearby Chatham Dockyard, which at the time was almost exclusively dedicated to the Royal Navy. During his time in the Navy, Lumley was on HMS Aboukir when it was sunk in the North Sea, along with two other ships, during World War I, and he spent several hours in the sea before he was rescued.

Together, Lumley and Emily had four children: Henry, who went to Cambridge University and became Director of Education for Rochdale; Leonard, who joined the Royal Navy and then later worked for an advertising company called Ripley Preston in Bristol, where the first well-known advertisements for Jubilee Clips were made; Dorothy, who married and stayed in Gillingham; and John, who eventually ran the family business.

During his time in the Royal Navy, it had often seemed obvious to Lumley that a new way needed to be found to attach a hose to a pipe. After leaving the Navy, he spent much time with a friend who had a lathe in his garage, making things, and in particular looking for a simple and effective solution to the problem.  Once he had the first clips made, he went to London every day attempting to sell them.  His wife Emily had such faith in her husband that she suggested re-mortgaging their house to pay for the first lot of steel, but this was never necessary because the company became successful.

Robinson collapsed and died while touring Grosnez Castle in Jersey on 20 August 1939, aged 62. His widow, Emily, died in 1985 at the age of 100.

Company

The UK declared war on Germany on 3 September 1939, just 14 days after Robinson's death. Before the end of the month, the War Ministry had realized the importance of Jubilee Clips for the war effort and men arrived from the ministry to take over the company. His widow, Emily, wasn't agreeable to the idea, however. She changed her surname by deed poll to Lumley-Robinson and ran the business herself throughout the war.

After the end of the war, she continued to run the business until her youngest son, John Lumley-Robinson, took over. He, being under 21 when his mother changed her name, had been the only other member of the family to take the surname Lumley-Robinson. During and after the war, other hose clip manufacturers started to emerge all over Europe, but Jubilee continued to be successful.  The business was finally incorporated on 1 April 1948 as L. Robinson & Co (Gillingham) Ltd.  Subsequently, the group grew with Jubilee Components Ltd and Jubilee Clips Ltd being formed to take on the manufacturing processes, alongside L. Robinson & Co (Plating) Ltd, an electro-plating company established in 1968.

In 1982, the group established a first overseas company when John Jennings (John Lumley-Robinson's son-in-law), founded Jubilee Clips Deutschland GmbH, in anticipation of Britain leaving the European Union under growing political pressure at that time.  This company continued to be a success selling Jubilee products in Germany and mainland Europe.

In 2007 to 2008, the group acquired a new site in Gillingham, Kent, where all of the UK-based manufacturing and distribution activities of the UK companies of the group were consolidated on one site. This was in the same town where the first Jubilee Clips were made by the original inventor, Lumley Robinson.

See also
 Marman clamp
 Cable tie

References

External links
 Jubilee Clips
 Vintage advertisements for Jubilee Clips

Hoses
Mechanical fasteners
British inventions